The 1984–85 Scottish Cup was the 100th staging of Scotland's most prestigious football knockout competition. The Cup was won by Celtic who defeated Dundee United in the final. The first round saw Stirling Albion record a 20–0 win over non-league Selkirk. This was the biggest win in British senior football in the 20th Century.

First round

Replay

Second round

Replays

Second Replay

Third round

Replays

Fourth round

Replay

Quarter-finals

Replays

Semi-finals

Replays

Final

See also
1984–85 in Scottish football
1984–85 Scottish League Cup

References

Scottish Cup seasons
Scottish Cup, 1984-85
Scot